The Minister Plenipotentiary of Aruba represents the constituent country of Aruba in the Council of Ministers of the Kingdom of the Netherlands. The current Minister Plenipotentiary of Aruba is Guillfred Besaril. The Minister Plenipotentiary and his cabinet are seated in the Arubahuis (Aruba House) in The Hague.

A significant difference between the Netherlands ministers and the Ministers Plenipotentiary is that the former ministers are accountable for their politics and policies to the Dutch parliament. The Ministers Plenipotentiary, however, are accountable to their national governments, which is the Estates of Aruba in case of Aruba. Therefore, the Ministers Plenipotentiary usually do not resign in the event of a Dutch cabinet crisis.

List of Ministers Plenipotentiary of Aruba 
The following table lists the Ministers Plenipotentiary of Aruba that have been in office since Aruba gained its status aparte in 1986:

References

External links 
  Arubahuis

Government of Aruba